Peter V of Alexandria may refer to:

 Patriarch Peter V of Alexandria, Greek Patriarch of Alexandria in the 7th–8th centuries
 Pope Peter V of Alexandria, ruled in 1340–1348